Julius Müller (16 December 1938 – 19 September 2017) was a German racewalker. He competed in the men's 20 kilometres walk at the 1968 Summer Olympics.

References

External links
 

1938 births
2017 deaths
Athletes (track and field) at the 1968 Summer Olympics
German male racewalkers
Olympic athletes of West Germany
People from Delmenhorst
Sportspeople from Lower Saxony